Kyung-hwa, also spelled Kyung-wha or Kyong-hwa, is a Korean feminine given name. Its meaning differs based on the hanja used to write each syllable of the name. There are 54 hanja with the reading "kyung" and 15 hanja with the reading "hwa" on the South Korean government's official list of hanja which may be registered for use in given names.

People with this name include:

Sportspeople
Yu Kyung-hwa (born 1953), South Korean Olympic volleyball player
Sung Kyung-hwa (born 1965), South Korean team handball player and Olympic champion
Park Kyung-hwa (born 1984), South Korean swimmer
Kim Kyong-hwa (born 1986), North Korean football player

Other
Kyung-wha Chung (born 1948), South Korean violinist
Kyunghwa Lee (born 1968), South Korean-born American performing artist
Han Kyeong-hwa (born 1977), South Korean voice actress
Kang Kyung-wha, South Korean diplomat, United Nations Deputy High Commissioner for Human Rights

See also
List of Korean given names

References